The Devil You Know is the only studio album by heavy metal band Heaven & Hell; the members had previously recorded as a group in an earlier line-up of Black Sabbath. The Devil You Know was Ronnie James Dio's final studio appearance prior to his death in May 2010.

The album's US import was released in Japan on 24 April 2009, four days earlier than its original due date of 28 April. The Japan domestic pressing which is a SHM-CD (Super High Material CD) was released on 27 April. It was produced by the band and sound engineer Mike Exeter.

The Devil You Know reached the top 10 in its first week of release, debuted at No. 8 on the Billboard 200 chart, with 30,000 copies sold. It was awarded Best Album at the 2010 Metal Hammer Golden Gods Awards.

Conception
In 2007 the Ronnie James Dio-era Black Sabbath line-up recorded three new tracks, "The Devil Cried", "Shadow of the Wind", and "Ear in the Wall" for an upcoming greatest hits package entitled Black Sabbath: The Dio Years. Guitarist Tony Iommi said that the tracks were created because he felt there was nothing worth releasing in the vaults from the Dio-era studio recordings and so these new songs were written and recorded. The song "The Devil Cried" was released as a promotional single for the release. Initially Dio commented that after the recording of those songs, he expected to leave the band and return to Dio and that another "Sabbath album" was "the last thing on my mind". Iommi commented that Heaven & Hell agreed on an album whilst the band was in Japan on their 2007 tour. The band started work on the album before and after the Metal Masters Tour in Dio and Iommi's houses respectively. Each member submitted CDs of material for the project. Iommi described the work as "really good, pretty powerful".

Title and art
The album artwork is adapted from a painting by Per Øyvind Haagensen entitled Satan. The artwork features the numbers 25 and 41. Geezer Butler stated in an interview that the numbers refer to the Bible verse Matthew 25:41, which deals with the Last Judgment where "those who sit at the left side of God are cast down into Hell". He also has explained that the name of the album is a reference to the name of the band, as fans know them as Black Sabbath. When finalising the cover art, the band narrowed it down to their two favourites but had a difficult time making a final decision. The second of those two favourites prominently features the traditional Black Sabbath devil logo. That alternative cover is available exclusively at Wal-Mart within the United States.

Critical reception

The Devil You Know has received generally positive reviews. The album currently holds a score of 63/100 at the aggregate review site, Metacritic, indicating mixed or positive reviews. AllMusic described the album as being like Black Sabbath's Paranoid in matching its moment. However, it goes on to note that Heaven & Hell expresses a "very different side of their musical personalities" than Black Sabbath, and that the differing band name is suitable. Metal Hammer described the album as "one of the heavy releases of the year" and honored it with a 2010 Golden Gods Award for Best Album. Martin Popoff rated the album as better than Dehumanizer, but not as good as Heaven and Hell or Mob Rules. He described Dio's vocals being delivered with "thespian enunciation" and "passion".

Touring
Heaven & Hell embarked on a second international tour (after their 2007 tour) in support of The Devil You Know. The band's first scheduled date was in Bogotá on 5 May 2009. They were supported by progressive rock acts Coheed and Cambria and The Mars Volta on North America for a select number of shows in August 2009.

Track listing

Charts

Personnel
Heaven & Hell
Ronnie James Dio – vocals, production
Tony Iommi – guitar, production
Geezer Butler – bass guitar, production
Vinny Appice – drums, percussion

Additional Personnel
 Mike Exeter – keyboards, additional production, engineering

Production
Recorded by Mike Exeter
Mixing and additional recording by Wyn Davis, assisted by Mike Sutherland and Adam Arnold
Mastered by Stephen Marcussen
Art direction and design by Masaki Koike
Cover illustration by Per Øyvind Haagensen
Photograph by Chapman Baehler
Etchings by Johann Koch

References

External links
Heaven & Hell at Metal Archives

2009 debut albums
Heaven & Hell (band) albums
Rhino Records albums
Albums produced by Mike Exeter
Albums recorded at Rockfield Studios